Alice Glacier is a  long tributary glacier in East Antarctica. It flows east from the Queen Alexandra Range to enter Beardmore Glacier at Sirohi Point. It was discovered by the British Antarctic Expedition, 1907–09, under Ernest Shackleton, and was named for the mother of Eric Marshall, a member of Shackleton's South Polar Party.

See also
 List of glaciers in the Antarctic
 Glaciology

References 

Glaciers of Shackleton Coast